The 2021 LA Bowl was a college football bowl game played on December 18, 2021, with kickoff at 7:30 p.m. EST (4:30 p.m. local PST) and broadcast on ABC. It was the inaugural edition of the LA Bowl (after the edition scheduled for 2020 was cancelled due to the COVID-19 pandemic), and was one of the 2021–22 bowl games concluding the 2021 FBS football season. Sponsored by late-night talk show host Jimmy Kimmel and independent investment bank Stifel, the game was officially known as the Jimmy Kimmel LA Bowl presented by Stifel.

Teams
Consistent with conference tie-ins, the game was played between teams from the Mountain West Conference (MWC) and the Pac-12 Conference.

This was the fourth meeting between Utah State and Oregon State; the Beavers had won all three previous meetings.

Utah State Aggies

Utah State defeated No. 19 San Diego State, 46–13, in the 2021 Mountain West Conference Football Championship Game on December 4.

Oregon State Beavers

Oregon State, with a 7–5 record, was led by quarterback Chance Nolan who completed 183 of 288 passes for 2,414 yards and 19 touchdowns during the season. Top rusher for the team was B. J. Baylor, who rushed 209 times for 1,259 yards and 13 touchdowns. Trevon Bradford was the top receiver, having caught 40 passes for 606 yards and 5 touchdowns. On the defensive side, Avery Roberts led the team with 128 tackles, one interception, and one forced fumble.

Game summary

Statistics

Largest t-shirt cannon 
During halftime, engineer Mark Rober and Anthony Hartman shot off the world's largest t-shirt cannon.

References

External links
 Game statistics at statbroadcast.com

LA Bowl
LA Bowl
Oregon State Beavers football bowl games
Utah State Aggies football bowl games
LA Bowl
LA Bowl